The 2014–15 Golden League  was the 3rd edition of the Golden League, 2nd in the women's gender, a friendly handball tournament organised by Denmark, France and Norway held in a series of three rounds of round robin tournaments being the first in Denmark, the second in Norway and the third in France.

First round
The first round was held in Denmark between 09 and 12 October 2014 in the cities of Holstebro, Esbjerg and Aarhus, the nation invited to play was Brazil

Second round
The Second round was held in Norway between 27 and 30 November 2014 in the cities of Larvik and Oslo, the nation invited to play was Serbia

Third round
The third round was held in France between 19 and 22 March 2015 in the cities of Dijon and Besançon, the nation invited to play was Poland

Final standings
For the final standings are counted only the matches in between the three host countries

References

External links
French Women's Team Official Website

2014 in handball
2015 in handball